Regional Services Department was a government department in Hong Kong, under the Broadcasting, Culture and Sport Branch. It carried out the policies and managed the facilities of the former Regional Council. After being abolished with the Regional Council in 1999, its functions were inherited by the Food and Environmental Hygiene Department and the Leisure and Cultural Services Department.

See also
 Food and Environmental Hygiene Department
 Leisure and Cultural Services Department
 Urban Council
 Urban Services Department

External links
Food and Environmental Hygiene Department 
Leisure and Cultural Services Department
Politics of Hong Kong
History of Hong Kong